Scott Beach (January 13, 1931 – February 13, 1996) was an American actor, writer and DJ, best known for his performance in the 1960s-themed 1973 film American Graffiti.

Life and career
Born Alvin Scott Beach, he appeared in numerous motion pictures, most notably as a German scientist patterned after Wernher von Braun in The Right Stuff. His deep voice was often heard in films. He once said that director George Lucas liked his voice and often used him in his films, beginning with THX 1138. Beach also appeared as Mr. Gordon in American Graffiti and provided an uncredited stormtrooper voice in Star Wars.

Beach was an early and beloved performer at the original Renaissance Pleasure Faires in Agoura and Novato, California, where for many years he portrayed the Lord Mayor of the Shire and was a mentor and an inspiration to many aspiring actors. Along with his acting career, Beach was a natural for radio and was on the staff of KSFO in San Francisco, California. During a radio broadcast on January 28, 1973, he reported that the Agreement on Ending the War and Restoring Peace in Viet Nam had been signed on the previous day in Paris, France. That agreement, also known as the Paris Peace Accords, ended direct U.S. military involvement in the Viet Nam War. Beach concluded his report about the peace agreement by stating, "I fear that the last U.S. soldier to die in Vietnam is still alive." He was correct; the last American death in Viet Nam was not until April 29, 1975. See McMahon and Judge. 

Beach twice served as the narrator in performances of Arthur Honegger's King David with the Masterworks Chorale of San Mateo, California. He also narrated other performances of the oratorio in both the original French and the English translation used by the Masterworks Chorale. He was the host of the San Francisco Opera broadcasts over KKHI during the early 1970s. Beach also provided the voice of the comic strip cat Garfield in the character's first television appearance in the 1980 anthology special The Fantastic Funnies; he was later replaced in that role by Lorenzo Music.

Personal life
Beach was married to Neva Beach, together they have two children; Dylan (b. 1965 - d. 2008) and Sarah. They both voiced Charlie Brown and Lucy Van Pelt (respectively) in It's Arbor Day, Charlie Brown.

Death
Beach died on February 13, 1996, at the California Pacific Medical Center at the age of 65.

Filmography

Film

Television

Video games

References

External links

Photographs of Scott Beach may be found at Broadcast Legends.

American male voice actors
American male film actors
Classical music radio presenters
Writers from Portland, Oregon
Male actors from Portland, Oregon
1931 births
1996 deaths
20th-century American male actors